Venus Williams was the defending champion, but lost in the first round to Daria Kasatkina.

Sloane Stephens won the title, defeating Julia Görges in the final, 7–5, 6–2.

Seeds

Draw

Finals

Top half

Bottom half

Qualifying

Seeds

Qualifiers

Qualifying draw

First qualifier

Second qualifier

Third qualifier

Fourth qualifier

External links
 Main draw
 Qualifying draw

ASB Classic - Singles
WTA Auckland Open